Anas Dabour (born 29 April 1991) is an Israeli footballer playing for Maccabi Ahi Nazareth.

Career
Dabour was born in Nazareth, Israel. He began his career in the youth system of Maccabi Ahi Nazareth. On 29 May 2009 he made his debut at the first team 2–4 loss to Hapoel Bnei Lod. 
During the 2012/13 scoring 8 league goals was third in the goalscoring records in the club after Alain Masudi and Serge Ayeli with 11 goals each. On 14 May 2014, he was transferred to Maccabi Netanya.

Personal life
Dabbur's family is Muslim. His brother Mu'nas Dabbur plays for Hoffenheim and the Israeli national team.

References

External links

1991 births
Living people
Arab citizens of Israel
Arab-Israeli footballers
Israeli Muslims
Israeli footballers
Maccabi Ahi Nazareth F.C. players
Maccabi Netanya F.C. players
Hapoel Haifa F.C. players
Hapoel Bnei Lod F.C. players
Hapoel Iksal F.C. players
Hapoel Rishon LeZion F.C. players
Liga Leumit players
Israeli Premier League players
Footballers from Nazareth
Association football midfielders